Wareside is a small village and civil parish in the East Hertfordshire district, in the county of Hertfordshire, England. The population of the civil parish in the 2011 census was 735. Nearby villages include Widford, Hunsdon, Babbs Green and Bakers End. Nearby hamlets include Cold Christmas and Helham Green. The B1004 road linking Ware to Bishop's Stortford goes through the village and the main A10 road can be joined up at Thundridge. Fanhams Hall Road links Wareside back to Ware.

Holy Trinity Church was built in the Lombardic style in 1841 by Thomas Smith and has been a Grade II listed building since 1967.

The village has a school: Wareside Church of England Primary School; two locally well-known pubs: The Chequers Inn and The White Horse; and is renowned within the area for its legendary "Wareside Treaclemine".

Governance
Prior to 1894, Wareside was part of the civil parish of Ware. Under the Local Government Act 1894 any parish which straddled urban and rural sanitary districts, as Ware did, was to be split to have separate parishes for each part. The part of the parish of Ware outside the urban sanitary district therefore became the parish of Ware Rural with effect from 4 December 1894, when the first parish meeting was held. Later that month, on 28 December 1894, the similarly named but much larger Ware Rural District came into effect as the higher tier authority. The Ware Rural District covered several parishes, including the Ware Rural parish.

Ware Rural parish was initially governed by a parish meeting, but a parish council was established for it in April 1895. Ware Rural parish became part of the district of East Hertfordshire on 1 April 1974, when the Ware Rural District was abolished. The parish of Ware Rural was renamed Wareside on 2 May 1991, with the parish taking the name of the largest settlement within its boundaries.

See also
 The Hundred Parishes

References

External links 
 Wareside Parish Council

 
Villages in Hertfordshire
Civil parishes in Hertfordshire
East Hertfordshire District